Lukasrand is an established suburb to the southeast of Pretoria, South Africa.

See also 
 Lukasrand Tower

References

Suburbs of Pretoria